Huazhuang station is a subway station on  and the  of the Beijing Subway. It is located in Huazhuang Village in Liyuan Town in Tongzhou District. It has a double-island platform. It is operated by Beijing Mass Transit Railway Operation Corporation Limited. The station was the eastern terminus for both lines until  station opened on August 26, 2021.

Station Layout 
Both the line 7 and Batong line stations have underground island platforms.

Exits 
There are 4 exits, lettered A, B, C, and D. Exits A and C are accessible.

Gallery

References

External links

Beijing Subway stations in Tongzhou District
Railway stations in China opened in 2019